Mr. Keegan's Elopement is a short story published by American writer Winston Churchill in June 1896 in The Century Magazine.   His first published story, it was republished in book format by Churchill's publisher Macmillan in June 1903 following the success of his  first three novels, especially 1899's Richard Carvel.

References

External links
Mr. Keegan's Elopement, full text via Google Books

1896 short stories
Works originally published in The Century Magazine
Novels by Winston Churchill (novelist)